DF-1 may refer to:
 DF-1 Protocol, a protocol used to communicate with most Allen Bradley RS232 interface modules
 Dongfeng-1, a missile
 Avimech Dragonfly DF-1 Tip Jet, an American helicopter design